Anonychomyrma extensa is a species of ant in the genus Anonychomyrma. Described by Emery in 1887, the species may be endemic to Indonesia and New Guinea, as its exact location remains unknown.

References

Anonychomyrma
Insects of New Guinea
Insects described in 1887
Taxa named by Carlo Emery